Carpe diem is a Latin phrase, usually translated "seize the day".

Carpe diem may also refer to:

Music
 Carpe Diem (Aqua Timez album)
 Carpe Diem (Belinda Peregrín album), 2010 
 Carpe diem (Lara Fabian album), 1994
 Carpe Diem (Will Haven album), 2001
 Carpe Diem (Heavenly album), 2009
 Carpe Diem (Karyn White album), 2012
 Carpe Diem (Nightmare album)
 Carpe Diem (Hande Yener album), 2020
 Carpe Diem (Olamide album), 2020
 Carpe Diem (Saxon album), 2022
 Carpe Diem, an album by Josh Dubovie
 Carpe Diem, an album by Pretty Maids
 Carpe Diem, a concert tour by Chris Brown
 "Carpe Diem", a song by Slovenian band Joker Out that is set to represent Slovenia in the Eurovision Song Contest 2023
 "Carpe Diem", a song by August Burns Red from their album Leveler
 "Carpe Diem", a song by Counterparts from the album Prophets
 "Carpe Diem", part of A Change of Seasons, an EP by Dream Theater
 "Carpe Diem", a song by The Fugs on the album The Fugs First Album
 "Carpe Diem", a song by Green Day from their album ¡Uno!
 "Carpe Diem", a song from the Phineas and Ferb episode "Rollercoaster: The Musical!"
 "Carpe Diem", a song by You Me at Six off their album Cavalier Youth
 Carpe Diem, a 2017 debut EP by K-pop boyband IN2IT
"Carpe Diem", the ending theme for The World Ends with You: The Animation, performed by ASCA

Other uses
 Carpe Diem (drink), a range of soft beverages distributed in Europe by Red Bull
 The Carpe Diem Trust, a UK-based charitable trust
 Carpe Diem, a novel from the "Agent of Change" sequence by Sharon Lee and Steve Miller
Carpe Diem (comic), a comic strip by Niklas Eriksson

See also
 Carpe Diem String Quartet
 Karpe Diem, a Norwegian hip hop group
 Seize the Day (disambiguation)
 Carpe noctem (disambiguation)